Notothenioidei is one of 19 suborders of the order Perciformes. The group is found mainly in Antarctic and Subantarctic waters, with some species ranging north to southern Australia and southern South America. Notothenioids constitute approximately 90% of the fish biomass in the continental shelf waters surrounding Antarctica.

Evolution and geographic distribution 
The Southern Ocean has supported fish habitats for 400 million years; however, modern notothenioids likely appeared sometime after the Eocene epoch. This period marked the cooling of the Southern Ocean, resulting in the stable, ice-cold conditions that have persisted to the present day. Another key factor in the evolution of notothenioids is the preponderance of the Antarctic Circumpolar Current (ACC), a large, slow-moving current that extends to the seafloor and precludes most migration to and from the Antarctic region.

These unique environmental conditions in concert with the key evolutionary innovation of Antifreeze glycoprotein promoted widespread radiation within the suborder, leading to the rapid development of new species.  Their adaptive radiation is characterized by depth related diversification. Comparison studies between non-Antarctic and Antarctic species have revealed different ecological processes and genetic differences between the two groups of fish, such as the loss of hemoglobin (in the family Channichthyidae) and changes in buoyancy. 

They are distributed mainly throughout the Southern Ocean around the coasts of New Zealand, southern South America, and Antarctica. An estimated 79% of species reside within the Antarctic region. They primarily inhabit seawater temperatures between −2 and 4 °C (28 and 39 °F); however, some of the non-Antarctic species inhabit waters that may be as warm as 10 °C (50 °F) around New Zealand and South America. Seawater temperatures below the freezing point of freshwater (0 °C or 32 °F) are possible due to the greater salinity in the Southern Ocean waters. Notothenioids have an estimated depth range of about 0–1,500 m (0–4,921 ft).

Anatomy 
Notothenioids display a morphology that is largely typical of other coastal perciform fishes. They are not distinguished by a single physical trait, but rather a distinctive set of morphological traits. These include the presence of three flat pectoral fin radials, nostrils located laterally on each side of the head, the lack of a swim bladder, and the presence of multiple lateral lines. 

Because notothenioids lack a swim bladder, the majority of species are benthic or demersal in nature. However, a depth-related diversification has given rise to some species attaining increased buoyancy, using lipid deposits in tissues and reduced ossification of bony structures. This reduced ossification of the skeleton (observed in some notothenioids) changes the weight and creates neutral buoyancy in the water, where the fish neither sinks nor floats, and can thus adjust its depth with ease.

Physiology 
Notothenioids have a variety of physiological and biochemical adaptations that either permit survival in, or are possible only because of, the generally cold, stable seawater temperatures of the Southern Ocean. These include highly unsaturated membrane lipids and metabolic compensation in enzymatic activity. Many notothenoids have lost the nearly universal heat shock response (HSR) due to evolution at cold and stable temperatures. 

Many notothenioid fishes are able to survive in the freezing, ice-laden waters of the Southern Ocean because of the presence of an antifreeze glycoprotein in blood and body fluids. Although many of the Antarctic species have antifreeze proteins in their body fluids, not all of them do. Some non-Antarctic species either produce no or very little antifreeze, and antifreeze concentrations in some species are very low in young, larval fish.

While the majority of animal species have up to 45% of hemoglobin (or other oxygen-binding and oxygen-transporting pigments) in their blood, the notothenioids of the family Channichthyidae do not express any globin proteins in their blood. As a result, the oxygen-carrying capacity of their blood is reduced to less than 10% that of other fishes. This trait likely arose due to the high oxygen solubility of the Southern Ocean waters. At cold temperatures, the oxygen solubility of water is enhanced. The loss of hemoglobin is partially compensated in these species by the presence of a large, slow-beating heart and enlarged blood vessels that transport a large volume of blood under low pressure to enhance cardiac output. Despite these compensations, the loss of globin proteins still results in reduced physiological performance.

Systematics

Naming
Notothenioidei was first described as a separate grouping, as a "division" he named Nototheniiformes, by the British ichthyologist Charles Tate Regan in 1913., this subsequently has been considered as a suborder of the Percifomes. The name is based on the genus Notothenia, a name coined by Sir John Richardson in 1841 and which means “coming from the south”, a reference to the Antarctic distribution of the genus.

Families 
This classification follows Eastman and Eakin, 2000 and includes references to additional classified species. Most species are restricted to the vicinity of Antarctica.

 Family Bovichtidae Gill, 1862
 Genus Bovichtus Valenciennes, 1832 
 Genus Cottoperca Steindachner, 1875
 Genus Halaphritis Last, Balushkin & Hutchins, 2002 
 Family Pseudaphritidae McCulloch, 1929
 Genus Pseudaphritis Castelnau, 1872
 Family Eleginopsidae Gill, 1893
 Genus Eleginops Gill, 1862 
 Family Nototheniidae  Günther, 1861
 Genus Aethotaxis H. H. DeWitt, 1962 
 Genus Cryothenia Daniels, 1981
 Genus Dissostichus Smitt, 1898
 Genus Gobionotothen Balushkin, 1976
 Genus Gvozdarus Balushkin, 1989
 Genus Lepidonotothen Balushkin, 1976 
 Genus Lindbergichthys Balushkin, 1979
 Genus Notothenia Richardson, 1844
 Genus Nototheniops Balushkin, 1976
 Genus Pagothenia Nichols & La Monte, 1936 P
 Genus Paranotothenia Balushkin, 1976
 Genus Patagonotothen Balushkin, 1976
 Genus Pleuragramma Balushkin, 1982
 Genus TrematomusBoulenger, 1902
 Family Harpagiferidae Gill, 1861
 Genus Harpagifer Richardson, 1844 
 Family Artedidraconidae Andriashev, 1967
 Genus Artedidraco Lönnberg, 1905
 Genus Dolloidraco Roule, 1913
 Genus Histiodraco Regan, 1914
 Genus Pogonophryne Regan, 1914
 Family Bathydraconidae Regan, 1913
 Genus Acanthodraco Skóra, 1995  
 Genus Akarotaxis DeWitt & Hureau, 1980 
 Genus Bathydraco Günther, 1878
 Genus Cygnodraco Waite, 1916
 Genus Gerlachea Dollo, 1900
 Genus Gymnodraco Boulenger, 1902
 Genus Parachaenichthys Boulenger, 1902
 Genus Prionodraco Regan, 1914 (one species)
 Genus Psilodraco Norman. 1937
 Genus Racovitzia Dollo, 1900
 Genus Vomeridens DeWitt & Hureau, 1980
 Family Channichthyidae Gill, 1861
 Genus Chaenocephalus Richardson, 1844 
 Genus Chaenodraco Regan, 1914
 Genus Champsocephalus Gill, 1861 (two species)
 Genus Channichthys Richardson, 1844
 Genus Chionobathyscus Andriashev & Neyelov, 1978
 Genus Chionodraco Lönnberg, 1905
 Genus Cryodraco Dollo, 1900
 Genus Dacodraco Waite, 1916
 Genus Neopagetopsis Nybelin, 1947
 Genus Pagetopsis Regan, 1913
 Genus Pseudochaenichthys Norman, 1937

References

Further reading
 Macdonald, J. A. (2004). "Notothenioidei (Southern Cod-Icefishes)". In M. Hutchins, R. W. Garrison, V. Geist, P. V. Loiselle, N. Schlager, M. C. McDade, ...W. E. Duellman (Eds.), Grzimek's Animal Life Encyclopedia (2nd ed., Vol. 5, pp. 321–329). Detroit: Gale.

 
Ray-finned fish suborders
Taxa named by Charles Tate Regan